Harpalus punctipennis is a species of ground beetle from Harpalinae subfamily that can be found in French and Italian Alps.

References

punctipennis
Beetles of Europe
Beetles described in 1852